Chattakkari may refer to:

Chattakkari (1974 film), Malayalam film released in 1974 starring Mohan and Lakshni
Chattakkari (2012 film), Malayalam film released in 2012 starring Hemanth and Shamna Kasim